Kavita Shah is an Indian environmental biotechnologist at the Institute of Environmental and Sustainable Development, Banaras Hindu University. She is one of the six directors and the only woman director of Banaras Hindu University (BHU). She is known for her role in the area of Environmental Biotechnology, Health and water Resource Management.

She has completed her MSc, B.Ed., Ph.D. and some post-docs and then she taught at NEHU and completed three more post-docs there. She started as a Zoology student in the women's college at BHU named Mahila Mahavidyalaya (MMV). Following stints in Japan, Geneva and North East Hill University in Shillong, she found herself coming back as a teacher at BHU.

A major area of work also include the development of biosensors using immobilized plant enzymes (Biotechnology and Bio process Engineering, 13, 632–638, 2008) and studies pertaining to inhibitors of HIV protease (In Silico Biology, 8–033, 2008), HIV integrase (Archives of Virology 2014) and N. meningitides vaccine constructs (Indian Journal of Biotechnology, 2010) in silico using bioinformatics tools.

References

External links 
 Biotechnology Career Advancement link

Year of birth missing (living people)
Living people
Indian environmental scientists
Indian biotechnologists